Diplolepis  may refer to:
 Diplolepis (wasp), a gall wasp genus in the family Cynipidae 
 Diplolepis (plant), a plant genus in the family Asclepiadaceae